DoorDash 250 may refer to:
 DoorDash 250 (truck series)
 DoorDash 250 (Xfinity series)